Andreas Leo Findeisen (born 1967) is an Austrian curator and media theorist. He co-founded the platform Empty Europe, Serious Pop, Transforming Freedom, X-OP, and Future Fluxus.

Life and work

He worked as an assistant to Peter Sloterdijk. He assisted with the research of Sloterdijk's trilogy about spheres. He is a fellow at WORM Rotterdam 

He was an jury member for the Digital Communities award at the Ars Electronica festival, the Europan 6 - In between Cities Festival, and a presenter at the Vilém Flusser Theory Award during transmediale 2010 and 2018

Literature

 2006. "Die Kunst des Verweilens"/ Edition Ostblick, 2006. (with Andreas Leo Findeisen and Hemma Schmutz)

References

Austrian art curators
Living people
1967 births